Vanab (also Romanized as Vanāb; also known as Bī Āb) is a village in Darram Rural District, in the Central District of Tarom County, Zanjan Province, Iran. At the 2006 census, its population was 12, in 4 families.

References 

Populated places in Tarom County